Damian Browne (born 17 May 1980) is an Irish former professional rugby union player turned extreme adventurer. Browne was capped by Ireland at U-21 level. He has played for Connacht, Northampton Saints, Brive, Leinster and Oyonnax. 

He began his career with Galwegians before earning a contract with Connacht in 2001. He agreed to sign for Northampton Saints in April 2004. Browne signed for Leinster in May 2011 along with Fionn Carr. His younger brother, Andrew played for Connacht.

Browne was the first person to row from New York City to Galway, Ireland, completing his trip on October 4th 2022 after 112 days at sea. In 2017 Browne completed the Atlantic Challenge solo after 63 days, six hours and 25 minutes at sea.

References

Living people
1980 births
CA Brive players
Connacht Rugby players
Galwegians RFC players
Irish male rowers
Leinster Rugby players
Northampton Saints players
Oyonnax Rugby players
People educated at St Joseph's Patrician College
Rugby union players from County Galway
Rugby union locks